Rickert is a surname of German origin. Notable people with the surname include:

 Heinrich Rickert (1863–1936), German philosopher
 Heinrich Edwin Rickert (1833–1902), German journalist and liberal politician
 Ludwig Rickert (1897–1963), mayor of Bonn
 M. Rickert (born 1959), American writer
 Rick Rickert (born 1983), American-born basketball player
 Shirley Jean Rickert 1926–2009), American child actress

See also
 Rickert v. Public Disclosure Commission, Washington State Supreme Court case

Surnames from given names